Polo Park (corporately styled as CF Polo Park) is a shopping centre in Winnipeg, Manitoba, Canada. It is situated on the former Polo Park Racetrack near the junction of Portage Avenue and St. James Street. Its grounds also includes a Scotiabank Theatre (formerly SilverCity). The mall is currently anchored by Husdon's Bay, Forever 21, Urban Planet, Sport Chek, and EQ3.

It is the largest mall of the 8 malls in the city, and is the 15th largest shopping centre in Canada, ranking between Guildford Town Centre and Laurier Québec.

For census purposes, Polo Park is also the name given to the neighbourhood including and surrounding the shopping centre.

History
The Polo Park Mall opened on Thursday, 20 August 1959, and became one of the first enclosed shopping malls in Canada when a roof was added in 1963, the other being the Park Royal Shopping Centre in BC.

The district was once the sports hub of Winnipeg, with the Winnipeg Arena, Canad Inns Stadium, and Winnipeg Velodrome all being located in the Polo Park neighbourhood. The Velodrome was torn down in the 1990s to make way for a strip mall that includes Home Depot and Chapters. The arena and stadium have also since been demolished and replaced by new retail and office complexes.

The former CKY building is situated next to the mall.  It used to house the city's CTV Television Network affiliate, CKY-TV, CKY radio, and FM 92 CITI. It was the original home of the WTN network. Corus Radio Winnipeg has occupied the building since 2011, as part of a lease agreement between Corus Entertainment and Cadillac Fairview.  Studios for CJOB 680, CFPG-FM 99.1 and CJKR-FM 97.5 are located on the second floor of the three-story building.

After Sears Canada closed its location in December 2017 due to bankruptcy, the anchor was redeveloped between March 2018 and October 2021 to house new tenants. A new flagship EQ3 store relocated from its former freestanding store to occupy the redeveloped building in November 3, 2021.

Expansions

In the spring of 1968, a $7.5-million expansion of Polo Park was completed. The addition brought a three-storey Eaton's department store to the mall, making Polo Park the second largest shopping centre in Canada at the time.

In 1986, the mall underwent a $75-million renovation that added a second level to the building. This addition was panned by downtown Winnipeg merchants, who voiced their objections to the plan at City Council meetings in 1984; Council approved the expansion nonetheless. The expanded shopping centre opened in mid-August 1986.

Another expansion took place in 2007, which added  and cost $30 million.

A new $49-million expansion to Polo Park opened 1 October 2014 in the former Zellers space on the mall's second level. The redeveloped space included  of retail space and 17 new stores.

Complexes 
Polo Park has also added new retail complexes, which are located on properties adjacent to the north of the mall.

Polo North is located on the site of the former Winnipeg Arena and features Marshalls, Mark's, Atmosphere, and the new head office of Western Financial.

It features Winners, HomeSense, Urban Behavior, Winnipeg Metropolitan Region Inc., and the first P. F. Chang's restaurant in Winnipeg. With parking capacity for over 1,200 vehicles, The Plaza was originally built to house Target Canada, which soon after went out of business throughout Canada.

References

External links

Polo Park
Buildings and structures in Winnipeg
Shopping malls in Manitoba
Shopping malls established in 1959
Cadillac Fairview
St. James, Winnipeg